The 1858 Hutt by-election was a New Zealand by-election held in the multi-member electorate of  during the 2nd New Zealand Parliament on 31 July 1858, following the resignation of Dillon Bell and Samuel Revans on 22 March. The election was won by Alfred Renall and William Fitzherbert, who had resigned from the multi-member electorate  in order to contest this by-election. That resignation forced a by-election to happen. Two other candidates unsuccessfully contested the electorate, George Hart and Peter Cheyne.

Results

References

Hutt 1858
1858 elections in New Zealand
July 1858 events
1850s in Wellington
Politics of the Wellington Region